Sredetska reka (Bulgarian: Средецка река) is a river in eastern Bulgaria. It is 69 km long with a catchment area of 985 km2. It empties into the Black Sea through Lake Mandrensko near Burgas.

The river has rich flora and fauna. There are more than 30 species of freshwater fishes, such as Flathead grey mullet, European chub, Common carp, Pontic shad, Romanian barbel, European bitterling, Common rudd, etc.

References 

Rivers of Bulgaria
Landforms of Burgas Province
Tributaries of the Black Sea